Beverly Joanne Linville (January 15, 1928 – June 20, 2021) was an American actress. She later taught at the Stella Adler Academy, Los Angeles. She is best known as a Romulan Commander on Star Trek: The Original Series.

Biography

Early life
Linville was born in Bakersfield, California, on January 15, 1928. She attended high school in Long Beach, California, and worked as an oral surgeon's assistant before studying acting. While she studied with Stella Adler, she danced professionally to pay her tuition.

Acting career
Linville's motion-picture credits include The Goddess (1958), Scorpio (1973), Gable and Lombard (1976), A Star Is Born (1976), The Seduction (1982), and James Dean (2001).

In 1959, Linville appeared on the CBS daytime drama The Guiding Light as Amy Sinclair, a runaway drug addict whose daughter was nearly taken from her as part of an illegal adoption scam ring.  Linville starred in two television presentations of One Step Beyond— as Aunt Mina in the episode "The Dead Part of the House" (1959) and as Karen Wadsworth in the episode "A Moment of Hate" (1960).

In 1961, she starred in the Twilight Zone episode "The Passersby".

In 1968, she guest-starred as a Romulan commander in Star Trek episode "The Enterprise Incident". This role earned Linville cult status, and remains her best-known performance.

Her other television appearances include Decoy (in the premiere episode), Alfred Hitchcock Presents, Have Gun Will Travel, Coronado 9, Checkmate, Adventures in Paradise, Empire, Gunsmoke (three episodes), Dr. Kildare, Ben Casey, Gunsmoke, Route 66, The Eleventh Hour, I Spy, Bonanza, The Fugitive, The F.B.I. (two episodes), The Invaders (two episodes), Felony Squad, Hawaii Five-O (three episodes), Kojak, Columbo: Candidate for Crime, The Streets of San Francisco (two episodes), Barnaby Jones, Switch, Charlie's Angels, CHiPs, Mrs. Columbo, Dynasty, and L.A. Law.

She appeared in the made-for-TV movies House on Greenapple Road (and the resulting series Dan August) (1970), Secrets (1977), The Critical List (1978), The Users (1978), and The Right of the People (1986). Linville played the mother of Janine Turner's character in Behind the Screen. Linville and George Grizzard starred in "I Kiss Your Shadow", the final episode of the television series Bus Stop.

Linville portrayed Valeria in the Broadway production Daughter of Silence (1961). Linville played gossip columnist Hedda Hopper in the television movie James Dean (2001), directed by her former husband Mark Rydell, who also played Jack L. Warner.

Writing and teaching 
Linville retired from acting in the 1980s to concentrate on teaching. She wrote Joanne Linville's Seven Steps to an Acting Craft, which was published in 2011 by Cameron and Company.

She taught "The Power of Language" course at the Stella Adler Academy in Los Angeles in 1985. One of her students was Mark Ruffalo, who wrote that she "does not theorise about great acting. She is great acting".

Personal life
Linville was married to actor/director Mark Rydell from 1962 until their divorce in 1973. Linville had two children with Rydell: Amy and Christopher, both actors.

Linville was also an amateur tennis player, and appeared at charity events where people were invited to pay $100 to challenge her in a game.

Death 
Linville died on June 20, 2021, aged 93.

Filmography

Partial television credits

References

External links
 
 
 
 
 

1928 births
2021 deaths
Actresses from California
American film actresses
American soap opera actresses
American television actresses
Place of death missing
Actresses from Bakersfield, California
20th-century American actresses
21st-century American actresses